Cold is the fifth studio album by the American dark wave band Lycia, released in 1996 by Projekt Records.

Reception 

Ned Raggett of AllMusic called Cold a "significant step forward in the trio's continuing sonic evolution" and noting the increased use of Tara VanFlower's vocals as well as electronics playing a larger role in the music

Track listing

Personnel
Adapted from the Cold liner notes.

Lycia
 David Galas – bass guitar, keyboards, synthesizer, sampler, programming, engineering, mixing
 Tara VanFlower – vocals
 Mike VanPortfleet – vocals, guitar, synthesizer, programming, mastering

Production and additional personnel
 Kevin Gray – mastering
 Ryan Lum – mastering
 Lycia – production
 Sam Rosenthal – art direction, design

Release History

References

External links
 

1996 albums
Lycia (band) albums
Projekt Records albums